is a Japanese badminton player. She is affiliated with the NTT East team.

Shinoya, together with her partner Kyohei Yamashita, won the mixed doubles bronze medal at the 2021 World Championships after losing in the semifinals to compatriots Yuta Watanabe and Arisa Higashino, 13–21, 8–21.

Achievements

BWF World Championships 
Mixed doubles

BWF World Tour (2 runners-up) 
The BWF World Tour, which was announced on 19 March 2017 and implemented in 2018, is a series of elite badminton tournaments sanctioned by the Badminton World Federation (BWF). The BWF World Tour is divided into levels of World Tour Finals, Super 1000, Super 750, Super 500, Super 300 (part of the HSBC World Tour), and the BWF Tour Super 100.

Women's doubles

Mixed doubles

BWF Grand Prix (3 runners-up) 
The BWF Grand Prix had two levels, the Grand Prix and Grand Prix Gold. It was a series of badminton tournaments sanctioned by the Badminton World Federation (BWF) and played between 2007 and 2017.

Women's doubles

  BWF Grand Prix Gold tournament
  BWF Grand Prix tournament

BWF International Challenge/Series (7 titles, 5 runners-up) 
Women's doubles

Mixed doubles

  BWF International Challenge tournament
  BWF International Series tournament
  BWF Future Series tournament

References

External links 
 
 

1994 births
Living people
Sportspeople from Aichi Prefecture
Japanese female badminton players